I Accuse! is a British 1958 CinemaScope biographical drama film directed by and starring José Ferrer. The film is based on the true story of the Dreyfus affair, in which a Jewish captain in the French Army was falsely accused of treason.

Plot synopsis
In 1894 Alfred Dreyfus (José Ferrer), a Jewish captain in the French Army, is falsely accused of treason. He is sentenced to life imprisonment on Devil's Island. Major Ferdinand Walsin-Esterhazy, an infantry officer of Hungarian descent, helps in the investigation. When he is found to be the real spy, the French Army tries to hide the truth by exonerating the traitor in a mock trial. Émile Zola, the famous French author, writes an open letter to the prime minister of France entitled I Accuse!, which reveals the truth behind the cover up. The letter is published in the newspaper, causing a firestorm around the world, leading to a re-examination of the entire Dreyfus case. Eventually, Esterhazy makes a full confession, and Dreyfus is completely exonerated, being inducted into the French Legion of Honor.

Cast

 José Ferrer as Captain Alfred Dreyfus
 Anton Walbrook as Major Esterhazy
 Viveca Lindfors as Lucie Dreyfus
 Leo Genn as Major Piquart
 Emlyn Williams as Émile Zola
 David Farrar as Mathieu Dreyfus
 Donald Wolfit as General Mercier
 Herbert Lom as Major DuPaty de Clam
 Harry Andrews as Major Henry
 Felix Aylmer as Edgar Demange
 George Coulouris as Colonel Sandherr
 Peter Illing as Georges Clemenceau
 Michael Hordern as Prosecutor
 Laurence Naismith as Judge
 Ernest Clark as Prosecutor
 Eric Pohlmann as Bertillon
 John Phillips as Prosecutor, Esterhazy trial
 Malcolm Keen as President of France
 Charles Gray as Captain Brossard

Production
The film was based on a book Captain Dreyfus: Story of Mass Hysteria which was published in 1955. In October 1955 MGM acquired an option on the film rights. The story had been filmed previously, notably in The Life of Émile Zola , but MGM claimed the book "contains quite a bit of material that had not come to life before".

The film was known as Captain Dreyfus before being retitled I Accuse.

The location work was done in Belgium, as the French army refused to allow filming in France. Filming finished by June 1957.

I Accuse! was a box office flop. It earned $190,000 in the US and Canada and $475,000 elsewhere, leading to a loss of $1,415,000.

Reception
Variety called the film "strong, if plodding, entertainment." The publication said Ferrer's performance is "a wily, impeccable one, but it comes from the intellect rather than the heart and rarely causes pity."

The Philadelphia Inquirer was unimpressed: "For no immediately apparent reason, the Dreyfus scandal...is being given a new screen airing....more zeal than art....Gore Vidal's plodding writing is almost constantly at odds with the overly melodramatic or numbed performances director-star Ferrer has elicited from himself and his cast....If Ferrer underplays drastically, the reverse must be said for almost everyone else in the large, hard-pressed cast."

New York Times critic Bosley Crowther wrote that the film's "studious and generally valid re-enactment of the highlights of the case offers rewards," but said the film lacked excitement and drama and that "Mr. Ferrer's Dreyfus is a sad sack, a silent and colorless man who takes his unjust conviction with but one outburst of protest and then endures his Devil's Island torment lying down. He is a chilly hero who stirs mere intellectual sympathy."

References

External links
 
 
 
 
 

1958 films
1950s historical drama films
1950s biographical drama films
British biographical drama films
British historical drama films
British black-and-white films
Films about the Dreyfus affair
Films based on non-fiction books
Films set in 1894
Metro-Goldwyn-Mayer films
CinemaScope films
Films directed by José Ferrer
Films with screenplays by Gore Vidal
Films scored by William Alwyn
Cultural depictions of Georges Clemenceau
Cultural depictions of Alfred Dreyfus
Cultural depictions of Émile Zola
1950s English-language films
1950s British films